Yuriy Pavlovich Shapochka (born 19 September 1952) is a Ukrainian rower who competed for the Soviet Union in the 1980 Summer Olympics.

In 1980, he was a crew member of the Soviet boat which won the silver medal in the quadruple sculls event.

External links
 profile

1952 births
Living people
Ukrainian male rowers
Soviet male rowers
Russian male rowers
Olympic rowers of the Soviet Union
Rowers at the 1980 Summer Olympics
Olympic silver medalists for the Soviet Union
Olympic medalists in rowing
Medalists at the 1980 Summer Olympics